Dionysius Periegetes (literally Dionysius the Voyager or Traveller, often Latinized to Dionysius Periegeta), also known as Dionysius of Alexandria or Dionysius the African, was the author of a description of the then-known world in Greek hexameter verse. He is believed to have been from Alexandria and to have lived around the time of Hadrian (r. 117–138), though some date his lifetime as late as the end of the 3rd century.

The work enjoyed popularity in ancient times as a schoolbook. It was translated into Latin by Rufius Festus Avienius, and by the grammarian Priscian. Archbishop Eustathius of Thessalonica wrote a commentary on his work for John Doukas.

Editions and translations

: reprinted Hildesheim: Olms, 1974  (this book contains also Eustathius' comment, the scholia, Avienius' Descriptio orbis terrarum and Priscian's Periegesis).
: reprinted Hildesheim: Olms, 1974 .

Further reading
Ulrich Bernays: Studien zu Dionysius Periegetes. Heidelberg: Winter, 1905.
E. H. Bunbury, A history of ancient geography among the Greeks and Romans from the earliest ages till the fall of the Roman Empire, 2 vols, London, 1879; 2nd edn 1883. Bunbury (vol. 2, p. 480) regards Dionysius as having flourished from the reign of Nero (54–68 CE) to that of Trajan (98–117 CE).

References

Biographical summary: 

Ancient Greek travel writers
Ancient Egyptian writers
2nd-century Egyptian people
Year of birth unknown
Year of death unknown